Pentrebach is a village in City and County of Swansea, Wales within the Pontarddulais ward.

Villages in Swansea